Princess Tatiana of Greece and Denmark (née  Tatiana Ellinka Blatnik, 27 August 1980) is a Venezuelan publicist, event planner, and writer. She is a member of the former Greek royal family and the Danish royal family as the wife of Prince Nikolaos, son of Constantine II, who reigned as King of Greece until the monarchy was abolished in 1973. She worked as a publicist and event planner for Diane von Fürstenberg and, in 2016, published the cookbook A Taste of Greece.

Early life and ancestry
Tatiana Blatnik was born in Caracas, Venezuela, and was raised in Switzerland. Tatiana and her brother, Boris Blatnik are the children of Ladislav Vladimir Blatnik and Marie Blanche Bierlein. Her mother is of aristocratic descent being a direct descendant of William II, Elector of Hesse. Her maternal grandparents are Ernst Bierlein (1920-2009) and Countess Ellinka Karin Harriet von Einsiedel (1922-2015). Princess Tatiana's father was born in the Kingdom of Yugoslavia in 1931 and later moved to Venezuela. He was engaged to the Hollywood actress Natalie Wood. Her father died when she was seven and she was raised by her mother. Her stepfather, Attilio Brillembourg, is the owner of a New York area financial services company.

Tatiana studied at Aiglon College, then at Georgetown University graduating in 2003 with a degree in sociology. Until July 2010, when she resigned to concentrate on her wedding plans, Tatiana had worked in the publicity department as an event planner for fashion designer Diane von Fürstenberg.

Engagement and marriage
Prince Nikolaos's engagement to Tatiana Blatnik, with whom he had been in a long-term relationship, was announced on 28 December 2009, by the office of King Constantine in London. Blatnik and Prince Nikolaos were married in the Orthodox Church of St. Nicholas, Spetses, Greece, on 25 August 2010. The bride wore a gown designed by Venezuelan Angel Sanchez.

Notable published works 
 A Taste of Greece: Recipes, Cuisine & Culture - with Diana Farr Louis – (2016).

Honours

 Greek Royal Family:
 Dame Grand Cross of the Order of Saints Olga and Sophia (25 August 2010)

References

1980 births
Greek princesses
Danish princesses
Princesses by marriage
Venezuelan people of Slovenian descent
Venezuelan people of German descent
Living people
Georgetown College (Georgetown University) alumni
Venezuelan emigrants to Switzerland
People from Caracas
Alumni of Aiglon College